Mir Abdoli may refer to:
 Mir Abdoli-ye Olya
 Mir Abdoli-ye Sofla
 Mir Abdoli-ye Zarrin Choqa